Arhopala pseudomuta, Raffles's oakblue, is a species of butterfly belonging to the lycaenid family. It was described by Otto Staudinger in 1889. It is found in  Southeast Asia - Peninsular Malaya, Singapore (A. p. )pseudomuta),Langkawi, Mergui, Burma, Thailand (A. p. ariavana Corbet, 1941),Sumatra, Borneo (A. p. contra (Evans, 1957) )

Subspecies
Arhopala pseudomuta pseudomuta (Peninsular Malaysia, Singapore)
Arhopala pseudomuta ariavana Corbet, 1941 (Langkawi, Mergui, Burma, Thailand)
Arhopala pseudomuta contra (Evans, 1957) (Sumatra, Borneo)

Etymology
The English name honours Stamford Raffles.

References

External links
"Arhopala Boisduval, 1832" at Markku Savela's Lepidoptera and Some Other Life Forms

Arhopala
Butterflies described in 1889
Taxa named by Otto Staudinger
Butterflies of Asia